Perico Fernández (19 October 1952 – 11 November 2016) was a Spanish professional boxer who competed from 1972 to 1987. He held the WBC light welterweight title from 1974 to 1975.

Professional career
Fernández turned pro in 1972 and captured the vacant WBC light welterweight title in 1974 with a split decision win over Lion Furuyama. He lost the belt the following year to Saensak Muangsurin from Thailand by TKO, with Muangsurin setting a world record by becoming world champion in only his 3rd fight. They fought a rematch in 1977 with Muangsurin winning a decision. Fernández retired in 1987.

See also
 List of WBC world champions
 List of super lightweight boxing champions

References

External links
 

1952 births
2016 deaths
Sportspeople from Zaragoza
Light-welterweight boxers
World Boxing Council champions
World boxing champions
Spanish male boxers